Sarepta was an ancient Phoenician city.

Sarepta may also refer to:

Places
 Sarepta, Louisiana, a town
 Sarepta, Mississippi, an unincorporated community
 Sarepta, a community within the town of Bluewater, Ontario, Canada
 Sarepta, a suburb of Cape Town, Western Cape province, South Africa

Other uses
 Sarepta Therapeutics, an American medical research and drug development company
 , a Royal Navy air station from 1917 to 1959, when it was renamed
 Sarepta M. I. Henry (1839–1900), a Woman's Christian Temperance Union leader

See also
 Old Sarepta, a district of Volgograd, Russia
 New Sarepta, a hamlet in Alberta, Canada